Matri-Phony is a 1942 short subject directed by Harry Edwards starring American slapstick comedy team The Three Stooges (Moe Howard, Larry Fine and Curly Howard). It is the 63rd entry in the series released by Columbia Pictures starring the comedians, who released 190 shorts for the studio between 1934 and 1959.

Plot 
The Stooges live in "Ancient Erysipelas," (parody of Ancient Rome) where they run Ye Olde Pottery shop. The powerful Emperor Octopus Grabus (Vernon Dent) is in search for a new wife again, with his sights set on redheads. Lovely Diana (Marjorie Deanne), who has kindled Grabus' interest, hides out in the Stooges' shop. A palace guard catches onto the scheme and all are brought to Grabus which are condemned to be fed to the lions at the Colosseum. The boys help Diana escape, while Moe and Larry convince Curly to dress up as Octopus's prospective bride. These two then destroy the glasses of the nearly-blind Grabus, who cannot see past his nose. The Stooges make a rapid escape by jumping out a palace window, but end getting caught, upside-down, on the spears of palace guards and were taken to the Colosseum to be finally fed to the lions as punishment.

Cast

Credited
 Curly Howard as Curleycue (as Curly)
 Larry Fine as Larrycus (as Larry)
 Moe Howard as Mohicus (as Moe)
 Marjorie Deanne as Diana
 Vernon Dent as Emperor Octopus Grabus

Uncredited
 Cy Schindell as Guard
 Eddy Chandler as Guard
 Max Wagner as Guard
 Bobby Barber as Snake charmer
 Monte Collins as Prime Minister
 Si Jenks as Wino
 Christine McIntyre as Beauty contestant (deleted scenes)
 Gene Roth as Middle guard

Production notes 
Matri-Phony was the first short filmed in 1942, shot over a period of three weeks between March 5 and March 25, 1942. It is the first Stooge film to employ the accordion-based, driving version of "Three Blind Mice" over the opening credits. This faster theme would be used until the end of 1944. The film title is a pun on the word "matrimony.

Matri-Phony had a difficult gestation. The three-week shooting schedule was unusual for a Columbia short film, as most were completed over four consecutive days. It is not known how many days it took to film, with six being an estimate. There were material script changes, reshoots and deleted footage, with most of the blame aimed at director Harry Edwards who had developed a reputation at Columbia Pictures as the studio's worst director. His poor directing skills are apparent throughout, with bad staging, awkward jump cuts and several unfocused shots. In the closing scene when the Stooges are hanging upside down from the guards' spears, Edwards inexplicably directed the guards to walk straight into a wall. His voice can also be heard loudly directing Larry Fine: "Larry, grab the.....". Larry was the only one who was not holding onto his guard's trousers: after receiving his direction, Larry quickly grabbed the pants. This type of exchange would normally be muted during post-production. After his next directoral effort with the Stooges (Three Little Twirps), the trio requested to never work with him again.

Curly Howard also began to exhibit subtle hints of his slow physical decline. DVD Talk critic Stuart Galbraith IV noted that it is "demonstrated in a scene where he tries to eat a live crab (with snapping claws), a variation of the oyster-in-the-soup gag from the previous year (from Dutiful But Dumb). It's reasonably funny, but Curly's timing is just a tad off and the two scenes make quite a contrast."

Quotes
Curly: "Oh, food!" (beholds the spread before him) "Vitamins A B C D E F GEE, I like food!"

References

External links 
 
 
 Matri-Phony at threestooges.net

1942 films
The Three Stooges films
American black-and-white films
1942 comedy films
Columbia Pictures short films
Films directed by Harry Edwards (director)
American slapstick comedy films
1940s English-language films
1940s American films